Rucka may refer to the following notable people:
 Greg Rucka (born 1969), American comic book writer
 Leo Rucka (1931–2016), American football player
 Rucka Rucka Ali (born 1987), Israeli-American rapper and comedian

See also